Grażyna Wolszczak (born 7 December 1958 in Gdańsk, Poland) is a Polish actress.

In 2016, she co-signed, together with hundreds of other people, a letter to Ban Ki-Moon calling for a more humane drug policy.

Filmography
Na Wspólnej (2003)
Wiedźmin TV series (2002) as Yennefer
Wiedźmin film (2001) as Yennefer 
An Air So Pure (1997)

References

External links
Grażyna Wolszczak at IMDb

Polish actresses
1958 births
Living people